Fantasm is a 1976 Australian softcore pornographic film, directed by Richard Franklin under a pseudonym. It was followed by a sequel, Fantasm Comes Again, the following year, directed by a pseudonymous Colin Eggleston.

Plot
German psychiatrist Professor Jungenot A. Freud takes the audience through a series of female sexual fantasies including:
sex in a beauty salon
fruit fetishism
lesbianism in a sauna
teacher student seduction
rape in a gym
transvestism
reverse Oedipus complex (Electra complex)

Cast

John Bluthal as Professor Jungenot A. Freud 
Ronnie Scholes as Self-Pleasuring Woman 
Beauty Parlour
Dee Dee Levitt as Abby
Stan Stratton as Hairdresser
John Green as Manicurist
Sam Compton as Barber
Card Game
Maria Arnold as Barbara
Bill Margold as Host
Kirby Hall as Husband
Robert Savage as Other Man
Helen O'Connell as First Girl
Wendy Cavanaugh as Second Girl
Wearing the Pants
Gretchen Gayle (Gretchen Rudolph) as Gabrielle
Con Covert as Intruder

Nightmare Alley
Rene Bond as Felicity
Al Williams as Rapist
The Girls
Mara Lutra as Francine
Uschi Digard as Super Girl
Fruit Salad
Maria Welton as Imogene
John Holmes as Neptune
Mother's Darling
Mary Gavin (Candy Samples) as Belle
Gene Allan Poe as Son
Black Velvet
Shayne as Celeste
Richard Partlow as First Client
Sam Wyman as Second Client
Paul Wyman as Third Client

After School
Sue Doloria (Roxanne Brewer) as Harriet
Al Ward as Teacher
Blood Orgy
Serena as Zelda
Clement St. George as High Priest
Robin Spratt as Female Satanist
Lyman Britton as First Satanist
Thomass Blaz as Second Satanist
Gary Dolgin as Third Satanist
Mitch Morrill as Forth Satanist
William Wutke as Fifth Satanist
Kirby Adams as Sixth Satanist

Production
In 1974 and 1975 Antony I Ginnane decided to enter the production field. He attempted to set up a Roger Corman type "nurses" film which he would produce and direct budgeted at $250,000 and then a crime drama set against the background of the massage parlour business called Sexy Little Me budgeted at $150,000, but was unable to find the money. However he could raise $50,000 and allocated directing duties to Richard Franklin, with whom Ginnane had worked with on the overseas marketing for The True Story of Eskimo Nell.

Franklin and Ginnane wanted to make something commercial so their options were a bikie, horror or sex film. They decided to make a sex film with Franklin pushing to make it more of a comedy. Ross Dimsey wrote a script, originally called Fantale, which was a send up of Swedish sex education films such as  Language of Love. Franklin:
With this thin veneer of medical 'therapy', or whatever, these films were being shown in these little underground cinemas and so on around the place. They were all essentially softcore, and we decided to make a kind of send-up of one, really. Not because we wanted to do a send-up, but because we didn't think we wanted to do a genuine one. We just wanted to make a fun film about sex!
Ginnane and Franklin had trouble finding actors who would appear in the film in Australia so only the linking scenes with the professor were shot in that country, with the sex scenes filmed in Los Angeles by Franklin and his cinematographer Vince Monton, using American porn stars. An old classmate of Franklin's from USC, Doug Knapp, was working in the area of porn and put them in touch with casting agent Bill Margold.

The US shoot took ten days, the Australian shoot took one day. Franklin says that John Bluthal, who played the professor, ad-libbed some of his dialogue, and that the porn actors were paid around $200 a day, except for John Holmes who was paid around $400 a day. Franklin:
That was an era where hardcore was NOT being produced in L.A. In fact, as I recall, we had the police call in on more than one occasion while we were shooting, just to make sure we weren't doing hardcore. But I was told, and I guess it would be evident if you studied the films of the era, but virtually all of the actors did hardcore work, but they did that in San Francisco or in Europe. But it was just a short period when hardcore porn was not… There was no problem shooting what they call T and A, tits and arse, but you weren't allowed to have people fucking on the set.
Despite the presence of American actors, Franklin says it was always his intention that the film be made primarily for the Australian market.

Reception
Although the movie was entirely soft core, around 45 seconds were cut out by the Australian censor prior to release. It was originally banned completely in the UK by the BBFC and is still only available with heavy cuts.

The film was extremely popular at the box office and ran for eight months and by 1979 had taken approximately $650,000 in Australia, despite being banned in Queensland. It led to a sequel Fantasm Comes Again (1977).

Franklin says its success enabled him to get financing for Patrick.
Even though I had done it under a pseudonym, it was perceived that I could make films that would make money... I usually don't list it in my filmography, not because I'm ashamed to have done it - I don't know whether Coppola lists HIS in his filmography! - but because it was such a low budget thing, and done in as I recall ten or eleven days, so it was really just like a series of student films strung together, if that makes sense. So I don't really, even though it runs feature length, I don't sort of think of it as a feature film.

References

External links

Fantasm at Oz Movies

1976 films
Australian pornographic films
1970s English-language films
Films directed by Richard Franklin (director)
Incest in film
1970s pornographic films
Films shot in Australia
Films shot in Los Angeles